Thomas Monaghan VC (18 April 1833 – 10 November 1895) was a British recipient of the Victoria Cross, the highest and most prestigious award for gallantry in the face of the enemy that can be awarded to British and Commonwealth forces, during the Indian Mutiny

Monaghan was born at Abergavenny, Monmouthshire. At 25 years of age, Monaghan was a trumpeter in the 2nd Dragoon Guards (Queen's Bays), British Army during the Indian Mutiny

Monaghan and the Dragoon (Charles Anderson) were both awarded the Victoria Cross for their bravery. Monaghan eventually achieved the rank of sergeant-trumpeter. His grave is at Woolwich cemetery, London and his Victoria Cross is displayed at the Queen's Dragoon Guards Regimental Museum at Cardiff Castle, Wales.

References

External links

Location of grave and VC medal (S.E. London)
Thomas Monaghan's grave at Victoria Cross website

British recipients of the Victoria Cross
2nd Dragoon Guards (Queen's Bays) soldiers
Welsh soldiers
1833 births
1895 deaths
Indian Rebellion of 1857 recipients of the Victoria Cross
People from Abergavenny
British Army recipients of the Victoria Cross
Welsh recipients of the Victoria Cross